South Island is a rock lying 22 nautical miles (43 km) west of McDonald Island, marking the southernmost feature in the McDonald Islands. Surveyed and given this descriptive name by the ANARE (Australian National Antarctic Research Expeditions) in 1948.

See also 
 List of antarctic and sub-antarctic islands

Landforms of Heard Island and McDonald Islands
Rock formations of Antarctica